= Trade unions in the Marshall Islands =

Trade unions in the Marshall Islands. With a total population of 59,000 the Marshall Islands support a very small economy which does not have a trade union structure. Their absence has been noted as a particular problem for Fijian nurses and teachers who have migrated to the Marshall Islands, usually on temporary work visa's. The Constitution allows for the general right of association; however, there is no legislation related to trade unions, collective bargaining, or strike action.
